Benjamin D. James (August 10, 1912 – July 4, 2015) was an American athletics coach, educator, and college administrator.  He served as the head football coach at Dickinson College in Carlisle, Pennsylvania in 1942, compiling a record of 1–5.

Biography
James was born on August 10, 1912 in Plymouth, Pennsylvania.  He entered Dickinson College in 1930 on an academic scholarship and participated in football, basketball, baseball, and track.  In football, he played as a center in the 1931 team that upset Penn State.

See also

 Plymouth, Pennsylvania

References

External links
 

1912 births
2015 deaths
American centenarians
American football centers
American men's basketball players
Dickinson Red Devils baseball players
Dickinson Red Devils football coaches
Dickinson Red Devils football players
Dickinson Red Devils men's basketball coaches
Dickinson Red Devils men's basketball players
Dickinson College faculty
College men's track and field athletes in the United States
High school basketball coaches in Pennsylvania
High school football coaches in Pennsylvania
People from Plymouth, Pennsylvania
Men centenarians